Matteo Pedergnana (born August 14, 1980) from Valfurva is an Italian ski mountaineer. He is member of the Sci Club Alta Valtellina as well as member of the national team.

Selected results 
Pedergnana placed third in the 2002 World Championship single race ("espoirs" class) and won four times the Pierra Menta (1999/2000/2001/2002) in younger class events, before he competed in "senior" events.

 2003:
 8th, Trofeo Mezzalama (together with Matteo Riz and Mario Scanu)
 2005:
 1st, European Championship relay race (together with Guido Giacomelli, Dennis Brunod and Manfred Reichegger)
 2010:
 2nd, Sellaronda Skimarathon, together with Thomas Martini

References 

1980 births
Living people
Italian male ski mountaineers
Sportspeople from the Province of Sondrio